John Richard Clawson (May 15, 1944 – December 15, 2018) was an American basketball player.

A 6'4" (1.93 m) small forward born in Duluth, Minnesota and from Naperville High School in Illinois, Clawson played at the University of Michigan, where his team won three Big Ten Conference titles and participated in two NCAA Final Fours. Clawson then represented the United States at the 1967 Pan American Games and the 1968 Summer Olympics, earning gold medals in basketball at both events. He also played for the United States men's national basketball team at the 1967 FIBA World Championship. From 1968 to 1969, he played for the Oakland Oaks of the American Basketball Association. He averaged 4.7 points per game with the Oaks and won a league championship in 1969.

After his basketball career ended, Clawson worked at Merrill Lynch and as a high school teacher in Danville, California. He later started his own construction company.

References

External links
 
 Profile at Naperville Central High School
 John Clawson's obituary

1944 births
2018 deaths
Amateur Athletic Union men's basketball players
American men's basketball players
Basketball players at the 1967 Pan American Games
Basketball players at the 1968 Summer Olympics
Basketball players from Minnesota
Medalists at the 1968 Summer Olympics
Michigan Wolverines men's basketball players
Oakland Oaks players
Olympic gold medalists for the United States in basketball
Pan American Games gold medalists for the United States
Pan American Games medalists in basketball
Small forwards
Sportspeople from Duluth, Minnesota
United States men's national basketball team players
Medalists at the 1967 Pan American Games
1967 FIBA World Championship players